William Henry Rayman (ויל ריימן; born April 1, 1997) is an American-Israeli basketball player who plays the power forward position for Hapoel Haifa in the Israeli Basketball Premier League. He played college basketball for Colgate, for whom in his senior year he was Patriot League Defensive Player of the Year and All-Patriot League First Team.

Early life
Rayman was born in New York City to Graham Rayman (a journalist and author) and Bronwen Hruska (a novelist and head of Soho Press), and grew up on the Upper West Side of Manhattan. He has one brother. He is 6' 8" (203 cm), and weighs 222 pounds (101 kg).

High school
Rayman had a four-year career at the Millbrook School, in Millbrook, New York. He was named the New England Preparatory School Athletic Council Class B Player of the Year after averaging 22 points, nine rebounds, and three assists per game as a senior at the Millbrook School. He was named All-Conference both his junior and his senior seasons. He finished his career with averages of 15 points and six rebounds per game.

He then played a season at New Hampton School, in New Hampton, New Hampshire. Rayman earned Region All-Star and All-Conference honors following his post-graduate year at New Hampton.

College
As a freshman at Colgate University in Hamilton, New York, in 2016-17, playing for the Colgate Raiders basketball team Rayman scored 14.6 points per game (9th in the Patriot League; while leading all Patriot League freshmen with 14.9 points per league game), set a Colgate first-year season record with 65 three-pointers, had a .691 free throw percentage (9th), and had 4.6 rebounds per game. He also set a Colgate first-year single-game scoring record that (breaking one previously held by Raider All-American and NBA player Adonal Foyle) with 34 points against Lafayette College. He was named Patriot League Rookie of the Year, to the Patriot League All-Rookie Team, and Colgate Athletics Male Rookie of the Year.

As a sophomore in 2017-18 Rayman scored 14.6 points per game (10th in the league), pulled down 6.7 rebounds per game (4th), with 0.8 blocks per game (9th), and had a 41.8% three-point shooting percentage, a 44.7% field goal percentage, and an 80.7% free throw percentage (4th in the league). He was named to the All-Patriot League men's basketball tournament team, Second Team All-Patriot-League, and National Association of Basketball Coaches (NABC) All-District Second Team.

As a junior in 2018-19, he scored 13.1 points per game, and had 6.5 rebounds (6th in the league), 0.8 blocks (10th), and 1.5 assists per game.  Rayman had a 42.9% three-point percentage, a 42.5% field goal percentage, and a 68.1% free throw percentage. He was named Second Team All-Patriot-League, and was named to the Patriot League All-Defensive Team, and to the Patriot League All-Tournament First Team.

As a senior in 2019-20, Rayman had 12.6 points, 9.0 rebounds (leading the league), 1.0 blocks (4th), and 1.7 assists per game, with a 44.4% field goal percentage, a 35.9% three-point percentage, and an 80.0% free throw percentage. He was named Patriot League Defensive Player of the Year, to the Patriot League All-Defensive Team and All-Patriot League First Team, and 2020 NABC District 13 second team.

Professional career
In 2020, Rayman played for Estonian team Tartu Ülikool in the Latvian-Estonian Basketball League. In the 2020-21 season, he played for BG Göttingen in the German Basketball Bundesliga.

Rayman has played for Hapoel Haifa in the Israeli Basketball Premier League since 2021.

References

External links
Colgate Raiders bio

1997 births
Living people
American expatriate basketball people in Estonia
American expatriate basketball people in Germany
American expatriate basketball people in Israel
American men's basketball players
Basketball players from New York City
Colgate Raiders men's basketball players
Hapoel Haifa B.C. players
Israeli American
Israeli Basketball Premier League players
New Hampton School alumni
People from New York City
People from the Upper West Side
Power forwards (basketball)
University of Tartu basketball team players